Princ Bajaja is a 1971 Czechoslovak fantasy film based on the fairy tale Prince Bajaja by Božena Němcová and directed by Antonín Kachlík.

Plot 
After the death of his parents, the young Prince Bajaja sets out to find his fortune. On his journey, he rescues an enchanted horse, who later comes to his aid. Disguised as a mute gardener, he gets acquainted with Princess Slavěna, who is to be sacrificed to a three-headed dragon on her 18th birthday. Her father, the king, is looking for a suitor for the princess, but no one is prepared to fight the dragon, except Bajaja, who receives magical armor from the enchanted horse. Although hurt, Bajaja defeats the dragon, but an evil knight takes credit for the deed.

Principal cast 
 Ivan Palúch - Prince Bajaja (Voice: Petr Štěpánek) 
 Magda Vašáryová - Princess Slavěna
 František Velecký - The black knight (Voice: Petr Čepek)
 Gustav Opočenský - The King

External links 

1971 films
Films based on fairy tales
Films based on works by Božena Němcová
Czechoslovak fantasy films
1970s fantasy adventure films
Czech fantasy adventure films
Films about dragons
1970s Czech films